Michael John Disney (born Bristol, England, 7 October 1937) is an astrophysicist. He discovered the optical component of the Crab Pulsar in 1969 with John Cocke. This was the first optical pulsar ever observed.
 
He was also one of the pioneers in the discovery of low surface brightness galaxies.

Disney was a professor at Cardiff University until his retirement in 2005.
Disney is an outspoken critic of the theory of cosmic inflation.

He was the co-author with Alan Wright of the humorous (and often mis-attributed) short story 'Impure Mathematics'.

References

External links
Cardiff University's School of Physics and Astronomy
 Mike Disney's homepage
 Oral history interview transcript with Michael Disney on 19 February 1976, American Institute of Physics, Niels Bohr Library & Archives

1937 births
Living people
20th-century British astronomers
Academics of Cardiff University